El Labrador is a Quito Metro station. It was officially inaugurated opened on 21 December 2022 as the nothern terminus of the inaugural section of the system between Quitumbe and El Labrador. After the official inauguration, the system functions in the testing regime. The adjacent station is Jipijapa.

It is an underground station, located 9 m below the surface.

The station is located on Calle Isaac Albéniz, next to the eponymous transport terminal. The entrance to the metro station is integrated with the entrances to the bus and trolleybus stations of the terminal. This is one of five such integrated stations of the first stretch of Quito Metro. It has access for disabled passengers.

The first train arrived to the station on 30 October 2020, during the trial phase. On 23 January 2023, the first train with 600 passengers to whom invitations were extended, arrived.

References

Quito Metro
2022 establishments in Ecuador
Railway stations opened in 2022